Imbramowice may refer to the following places in Poland:
Imbramowice, Lower Silesian Voivodeship (south-west Poland)
Imbramowice, Lesser Poland Voivodeship (south Poland)